Otto II. Freiherr von Münchhausen (11 June 1716 – 13 July 1774) was a German botanist.  He was Chancellor of University of Göttingen and a correspondent of Linnaeus.  He named several species of oaks by the Linnean system, as well as other plants.

The standard botanical author abbreviation Münchh. is applied to species he described.

References
ADB:Münchhausen, Otto Freiherr von. de.wikisource.org (in German)
GRIN Taxonomy for Plants. USDA

1716 births
1774 deaths
Academic staff of the University of Göttingen
18th-century German botanists
Barons of Germany
Botanists with author abbreviations